Mount Zion is an unincorporated community in Henry County, in the U.S. state of Missouri.

History
A post office called Mount Zion was established in 1873, and remained in operation until 1910. The community took its name from a nearby Methodist Episcopal church of the same name.

References

Unincorporated communities in Henry County, Missouri
Unincorporated communities in Missouri